"Air Hostess" is a song by English pop punk band Busted. Composed by the band along with Tom Fletcher of McFly and Stewart Henderson, it was released on 26 April 2004 as the third single from their second studio album, A Present for Everyone (2003), and reached number two on the UK Singles Chart.

Background and promotion
The song was inspired by flight attendants which Busted saw whilst on tour. The B-sides "Mummy Trade", "Peaches" and "Let It Go" did not appear on any other release, and were exclusive to this single. "Mummy Trade" was written by James Bourne and Charlie Simpson, "Let It Go" was written by Bourne and McFly members Harry Judd and Dougie Poynter, while "Peaches" is a cover of The Presidents of the United States of America. They were occasionally played live, such as on CD:UK which was on 1 May 2004 on ITV1.

The single was also promoted by appearances on Top of the Pops Saturday, MOM, Popworld, CD:UK, Friday Night with Jonathan Ross, TRL and the short-lived Simply the Best.

Music video
A humorous music video was made in which the band spy on two female flight attendants and illegally board the aeroplane (Concorde) they are travelling on. The line "I messed my pants when we flew over France" was edited out when the video was shown during the daytime.

Track listings

UK CD1
 "Air Hostess"
 "Mummy Trade"

UK CD2
 "Air Hostess"
 "Peaches"
 "Let It Go"
 "Air Hostess" (video)
 Interactive interview

UK limited-edition 7-inch picture disc
A. "Air Hostess"
B. "Let It Go"

Japanese mini-album
 "Air Hostess"
 "Let It Go"
 "Peaches"
 "Mummy Trade"
 "You Said No" (live)
 "Sleeping with the Light On" (live)
 "What I Go to School For" (Steve Power mix)
 "Air Hostess" (video)

Personnel
Personnel are taken from the A Present for Everyone album booklet.
 James Bourne – writing
 Charlie Simpson – writing
 Matt Willis – writing
 Tom Fletcher – writing
 Steve Power – production, mixing, programming
 Dan Porter – assistant recording engineer

Charts

Weekly charts

Year-end charts

Certifications

References

2003 songs
2004 singles
Busted (band) songs
Island Records singles
Song recordings produced by Steve Power
Songs about aviators
Songs written by Charlie Simpson
Songs written by James Bourne
Songs written by Matt Willis
Songs written by Tom Fletcher
Universal Music Group singles